Brass Knuckles is the fifth studio album by American recording artist Nelly, released on September 16, 2008 after several delays. In 2008 Nelly embarked on The Brass Knuckles Tour in support of the album.

Background 
Production was set to come from Bryan-Michael Cox, Neff-U and Pharrell, among others. Nelly mentioned in an interview that producer Polow da Don produced tracks for the album. On March 30, Nelly told HipHopDX.com that "the album would feature a handful of new producers." Nelly was set to collaborate with Springsteen but he stated he was hopeful to collaborate with him on a future album, or even a repackage of Brass Knuckles. Dupri gave a look into the two collaborations, one being Nelly, Carey and Jackson all appearing on the same track, in which he stated Nelly has laid the following blueprint.

Nelly's got a crazy collaboration he's trying to put together, which is him, Janet and Mariah Carey all on one song...That's what he wants. If he could convince them to do it, it would be crazy. [He] wants [Janet] to rap a 16-bar verse, he wants [Mariah] to sing the hook and he's gonna do two verses. [He] has it all planned out. You ask him about it! This is what he wants; he's 100-percent deadlocked into it.

Jermaine Dupri also stated possibilities of hopeful collaborations with Bruce Springsteen, Mariah Carey and Janet Jackson. Nelly went on to speak about the possibility of the Springsteen collaboration and that two of his own tracks will appear on the album.

I think he's doing a record with Bruce Springsteen. You know he always has to do one of those! My two records [that J.D. has produced for Nelly so far], he's gonna have some people on them—I won't tell it yet. I don't want to jinx the record.

Singles 
The first single was believed to be "Cut It Out" which features rappers Pimp C and Sean P of YoungBloodZ, but was later confirmed to be "Wadsyaname", which was released digitally on August 21, 2007. However, because of the pushed release dates from October 16, 2007 and on, the first official single was changed to "Party People", which features Fergie. It was released on March 18, 2008 and peaked at number forty on the US Billboard Hot 100 and number fourteen on the UK Singles Chart. The album's second single "Stepped on My J'z", which features Ciara and Jermaine Dupri was released on June 11, 2008. It peaked at number ninety on the US Billboard Hot 100. "Body on Me", which features Akon and Ashanti, was released as the third single from the album on June 9, 2008. It peaked at number forty-two on the US Billboard Hot 100 and number three on the UK Singles Chart.

Critical reception 

Reviews for the album have been generally mixed. Pharoh Martin of Vibe stated that "Brass Knuckles is standard Nelly fare." RapReviews wrote that "underneath the materialistic veneer Nelly's got a good delivery, sharp lyrics and impeccable breath control."

Commercial performance 
Brass Knuckles debuted at number 3 on the Billboard 200, selling 83,717 copies in its first week in the United States. Only 8-weeks later, the album was left on the Billboard 200 chart. On March 21, 2009, the album re-appeared at number 152. On December 12, 2008, the album was certified gold by the Recording Industry Association of America (RIAA) for shipping over 500,000 copies in the United States. As of September 2010, the album has sold over 223,000 copies in the United States.

Track listing 

Sample credits
"Stepped on My J'z" Contains a sample of "Tipsy" performed by J-Kwon.

Charts

Weekly charts

Year-end charts

Certifications

References 

2008 albums
Nelly albums
Albums produced by Akon
Albums produced by Jermaine Dupri
Albums produced by Polow da Don
Albums produced by the Neptunes
Albums produced by Droop-E
Albums produced by Theron Feemster